Pia-Sophie Wolter (born 13 November 1997) is a German footballer who plays as a midfielder for VfL Wolfsburg and the Germany national team.

International career
Wolter made her international debut for Germany on 1 December 2020, coming on as a substitute in the 61st minute for Kathrin Hendrich against the Republic of Ireland. The away match finished as a 3–1 win for Germany.

Career statistics

International

References

External links
 
 
 
 

1997 births
Living people
Footballers from Bremen
German women's footballers
Germany women's international footballers
Germany women's youth international footballers
Women's association football midfielders
SV Werder Bremen (women) players
VfL Wolfsburg (women) players
Frauen-Bundesliga players
2. Frauen-Bundesliga players